Savane may refer to:
 Savane (album), Ali Farka Touré album
 Savane (sportswear), sportswear collection owned by Perry Ellis International
 Savane (software), free web-based software hosting system used by GNU Savannah (forked from SourceForge)
 Savané, surname
 Savane church, an 11th-century Georgian Orthodox church in the eponymous village in the western Georgian region of Imereti
 Savane River (disambiguation)